Iran Air Flight 277 was a scheduled Iran Air flight from Mehrabad International Airport, Tehran to Urmia, Iran.  On January 9, 2011, the Boeing 727 serving the flight crashed after an aborted approach to Urmia Airport in poor weather. Of the 105 people on board, 78 were killed. The official investigation concluded that icing conditions and incorrect engine management by the crew led to a double engine flame-out, loss of altitude and impact with the ground.

Accident
Flight 277 had taken off from Mehrabad International Airport, Tehran, at 18:15 local time (15:15 UTC), more than two hours later than scheduled because of poor weather at the destination.

At around 19:00 local time (16:00 UTC), while on approach to Urmia Airport, the crew initiated a missed approach procedure and announced its intention to return to Tehran.

Contact with the flight was lost shortly after. Of the 96 passengers and 9 crew on board, only 27 survived.

Aircraft and crew
The aircraft involved in the accident was a tri-jet Boeing 727-286Adv with Iranian registration EP-IRP. Manufactured in 1974, the aircraft had spent 18 years out of service. It was impounded at Baghdad, Iraq from 1984 to 1990, and then placed in storage from 1991 to 2002. It was then overhauled and returned to service.

The flight crew consisted of captain Fereydoun Dadras, first officer Mohammad Reza Qara Tappeh, and flight engineer Morteza Rastegar.

Casualties
Of the 105 people on board, 78 were killed (including the flight crew) and 27 survived, all with injuries. Most of the victims sustained injuries to the neck and spinal cord. In the aftermath of the crash, 36 ambulances and 11 hospitals were utilized in the rescue operations.

Investigation
Iran's Civil Aviation Authority (CAA.IRI) opened an inquiry into the crash. The day after the accident, both the flight's cockpit voice recorder (CVR) and the flight data recorder (FDR) were recovered and taken to Tehran for analysis.

In 2017, CAO.IRI published its final accident report. From its analysis, it emerged that after starting its final approach to Urmia Airport's runway 21 from an altitude of  – Urmia Airport being at an elevation of  – a navigational error by the flight crew meant that the aircraft failed to establish itself on the instrument landing system. Descending through  and having never made visual contact with the runway, the crew elected to go around.

Investigators believe the aircraft encountered severe icing conditions, which caused disruption of the airflow and loss of engine thrust. The aircraft started to descend and entered a turn that momentarily reached 41° bank angle, causing the activation of the stick shaker. Despite application of full thrust, engines No. 1 and 3 began to run down. As the aircraft descended through , the flight engineer could be heard announcing that both engines had failed. Subsequent attempts to restart them were unsuccessful.

The report concluded that the main causes of the accident were severe icing conditions and inappropriate actions by the flight crew. Obsolete on-board systems, absence of suitable simulators for adverse weather conditions, failure to follow standard operating procedures, and inadequate crew resource management were cited as contributing factors.

See also
List of accidents and incidents involving commercial aircraft

References

External links

 CAO.IRI – Final accident report (in Persian) – Archived
 

2011 in Iran
Aviation accidents and incidents in Iran
Accidents and incidents involving the Boeing 727
Aviation accidents and incidents in 2011
2011
January 2011 events in Iran
Airliner accidents and incidents caused by ice
Airliner accidents and incidents caused by engine failure
Airliner accidents and incidents caused by pilot error